This is a list of flying aces in World War I from Canada. A flying ace is a military aviator credited with shooting down five or more enemy aircraft during aerial combat. Canadians served in the British flying services–the  Royal Flying Corps, the Royal Naval Air Service, and the Royal Air Force, as Canada had no air arm until the formation of the Canadian Air Force on September 19, 1918.

For a master list of victories during the conflict, see List of World War I flying aces.

Canadian World War I aces

More than 10 victories

Fewer than 10 victories

See also
List of Canadian air aces

References

External links

Canadian aces of World War I
Fighter Pilot Aces List
Canada - World War I

Canada
Lists of Canadian military personnel